The NWA Southeastern Heavyweight Championship (Southern Division) was originally the primary singles championship for Gulf Coast Championship Wrestling and was originally named the NWA Gulf Coast Heavyweight Championship. As the name indicates the title was recognized by the National Wrestling Alliance as a local title promoted in the Tennessee, Alabama, Florida and Mississippi region from 1957 until 1977 when its name was changed for the Southern Division of Southeast Championship Wrestling. In 1980 the title was abandoned and the Northern division of the NWA Southeastern Heavyweight Championship became the main title of SECW.

Title history

See also
National Wrestling Alliance
Gulf Coast Championship Wrestling

References

External links
Wrestling-Titles.com

Heavyweight wrestling championships
United States regional professional wrestling championships